The Speckled Monster: A Historical Tale of Battling Smallpox is a book written by Jennifer Lee Carrell. 

In 2015 Senator Rand Paul praised the book during the Republican presidential debate.

Reception

Publishers Weekly called the book "engaging" but criticized all the dialog for slowing down the action. 

Kirkus Reviews complained that the "narrative that runs on far too long".

References

American historical novels